Umpqua Valley Christian School is a private Christian school located in Roseburg, Oregon, United States supporting the education of grades K-12 on a single campus. 
The school has been a member of the Association of Christian Schools International since 2003, and was accredited by Northwest Accreditation Commission in 2004 and again by AdvancED after merging with NWAC in 2012.

References

High schools in Douglas County, Oregon
Educational institutions established in 1974
Private middle schools in Oregon
Christian schools in Oregon
Private high schools in Oregon
1974 establishments in Oregon